Prabhat Sarma (7 July 1935 – 2 March 2021) was a folk exponent and flutist from Assam, India.

Personal life and family
Sarma's daughter Tarali Sarma is a National Award-winning singer.

Career
Sarma was a staff artist in the Information and Public Relations Department of the Government of Assam from 1960 to the end of 1990. He joined Akashvani Guwahati Centre in 1973 and retired from his job in 1998.

Sarma formed a musical team called Panchjanya Sankhadhanni with various indigenous musical instrumentalists from Assam. Panchjanya Sankhadhanni was later renamed as Devgandhar. In addition to working as music director in Assamese films like Black-money, Santaan, Sandhyarag, Sarathi, Aaponjan, Mohmukti, Anal, Kadamatale Krishna Naache, Shrimanta Shankardev, etc., Sarma also performed music in the Assamese TV serials like Patharughate Ringiyai and Brikodar Baruar Biya.

Sarma was regarded as a distinguished performer of Borgeet which were composed by Srimanta Sankardeva and Madhavdeva in the 15th-16th centuries.

Sarma was also exploring Sattriya dance, a classical form pioneered in Assam by Srimanta Sankardeva. He had a number of musical instruments, including a few that are now obsolete, built a miniature museum and later used the obscure instruments to perform orchestras. He played different indigenous folk instruments like the Khol, Nagara, Bhortal, Dotara and Tabla.

Awards
Sarma received the Sangeet Natak Akademi Award in 2003 for his contribution to the traditional and folk music of Assam. He was honored with the Asom Shilpi Diwas Award by the Assam government in 2001.

Death
Sarma died on 2 March 2021 due to age-related ailments.

References

Singers from Assam
Indian male folk singers
Indian flautists
1935 births
2021 deaths
Recipients of the Sangeet Natak Akademi Award